Combe railway station serves the village of Combe in Oxfordshire, England. It is on the Cotswold Line. This station and all trains serving it are run by Great Western Railway.

It was opened as Combe Halt by the Great Western Railway in 1935, originally having two platforms. In 2012, it was equipped with the modern Customer Information display screen now found on most First Great Western stations, plus an automatic train announcement system.

The station is about half a mile from the village of Combe (to the NW) and the hamlet of Combe East End (to the NE).

Services
Since at least February 1999 the station has been served by a minimal service of two trains per day, one in each direction.

There are currently no weekend services at the station with a normal service running on most Bank Holidays.

References

Notes

Sources

 

Railway stations in Oxfordshire
DfT Category F2 stations
Former Great Western Railway stations
Railway stations in Great Britain opened in 1935
Railway stations served by Great Western Railway